Enigma is a Canadian documentary TV series about enigmas throughout history developed by Reel Time Images and VisionTV Reel Time Images. Each episode is 47 minutes and focuses on a riddle, a puzzle, or mystery, which the documentary sets out to solve or illuminate.

Episodes
(in alphabetical order)
  Aleister Crowley: The Beast 666
 Conjuring Philip
 Hypnotized!: The Trance State
 Jack Parsons: Jet Propelled Antichrist
 Madame Blavatsky: Spiritual Traveller
 Max Maven: A Fabulous Monster
 Silo: Sage of The Andes
 Spiritualism:The Fox Sisters
 Tarot
 The Houdini Code
 Zombies: When the Dead Walk

References

External links
Reel Time Images website
VisionTV website

2000s Canadian documentary television series
Paranormal television
VisionTV original programming